Paul Miller (born 31 January 1968) is an English former professional footballer who played as a midfielder.

He notably played in the Premier League for Wimbledon during the 1993-94 season, as well as playing in the Football League for Bristol Rovers, Bristol City and Lincoln City. He also played at Non-League level for Yeovil Town and Lincoln United

Career
Miller was an active professional in the game from 1986 until 2001 in this time he appeared for Yeovil Town, Bristol Rovers, Wimbledon, Newport County, Bristol City and Lincoln City. After being released from Lincoln at the end of the 2000–2001 season, he moved to the club's non league local rivals Lincoln United, where he played at a semi professional level until retiring in 2005 after a short spell at Hucknall Town. As a player, he helped Wimbledon to the 1988 FA Cup Final where they achieved a shock 1–0 win over Liverpool. However, Miller was not in the squad for that game. He played a total of 80 top flight games for Wimbledon.

Personal life
In 2011 Miller began working for Serco Limited, a Lincoln-based Air Conditioning and Electrical Contractor and currently manages their Planned Maintenance division.

References

External links
Unofficial Paul Miller Profile at The Forgotten Imp

1968 births
Living people
English footballers
Yeovil Town F.C. players
Bristol Rovers F.C. players
Wimbledon F.C. players
Newport County A.F.C. players
Bristol City F.C. players
Lincoln City F.C. players
Hucknall Town F.C. players
Lincoln United F.C. players
Premier League players
Sportspeople from Woking
Association football midfielders